Langkawi International Airport  is an airport in Padang Matsirat, Langkawi, Kedah, Malaysia.

In 2015, the airport handled 2,336,177 passengers and 30,853 aircraft movements.

The airport serves as a venue for the Langkawi International Maritime and Aerospace Exhibition (LIMA), an international aerospace event for aviation industry and aero performances for the public. The airport's capacity was upgraded to accommodate 4 million passengers per year in September 2018.

Airlines and destinations

History
Construction of the modern airport began in 1991 and was finished in December 1993. Langkawi International Airport had been the airfield of Japanese army in 1945 and later for the British army. Kedah has two airports: Langkawi International Airport and Sultan Abdul Halim Airport.

Expansion and development
The airport has undergone Phase 1 expansion with the current capacity of 4 million passengers for approximately RM89 million. The gross floor area has been increased to 23,000 square meters (247570 sq ft), increased parking spaces to 600 bays and up to 8 boarding gates. The runway is capable of handling Boeing 747 aircraft.

There is a private premium lounge in the departure hall. Facilities include food & beverage, bar, Wi-Fi, shower facility, phone and charging station. It is exclusively for departing passengers. The number of counters at passenger touchpoints have also increased to 30 check-in counters and 18 immigration counters.

Phase 2 of the expansion involves the construction of a proposed aerobridge, which is designed to handle the increasing volume of direct international flights. More amenities like arrival hall, commercial terminal, toilet, prayer rooms and driveway to the main terminal are to be included in the expansion.

Traffic and statistics

See also

 Transportation at Langkawi
 List of airports in Malaysia

Notes

References

External links

 Langkawi International Airport at Malaysia Airports Holdings Berhad
 Langkawi International Airport Real Time Flight Schedule
 
 

Airports in Kedah
Langkawi